Maksim Andreyevich Fyodorov (born 5 April 1989) is a Russian former professional footballer.

Career
He made his professional debut in the Russian Second Division in 2006 for FC Krylia Sovetov-SOK Dimitrovgrad.

He played in the Russian Football National League for FC Dynamo Bryansk in 2010.

External links

References

1989 births
People from Rasskazovo
Living people
Russian footballers
Association football midfielders
PFC CSKA Moscow players
FC Lada-Tolyatti players
FC Dynamo Bryansk players
Sportspeople from Tambov Oblast
FC Tolyatti players